The Cockstock incident was a major factor in the passage of an 1844 exclusion law against free black men living within the U.S. Territory of Oregon. It centered on a fight between a Wasco Native American man, Cockstock, and a free black man, James D. Saules, over ownership of a horse. The argument escalated into a melee on March 4, 1844 that killed three men, and led to rhetoric among white settlers that African Americans could create an uprising among local Native American tribes against black and white settlers alike.

Background 
A Wasco man named Cockstock was employed on black pioneer Winslow Anderson's farm in 1843, with a horse promised as payment. By the end of Cockstock's contract, the farm, and the horse, had transferred from Anderson to another black pioneer, James D. Saules. This angered Cockstock, who took the horse and issued threats to both settlers. Saules wrote a letter to a provisional government official, Elijah White, claiming that Cockstock had harassed settlers and had "murdered several Indians lately." Saules wrote that he feared for his life. White issued an order for Cockstock to surrender the horse and a $100 warrant was issued for his arrest. White wrote that he had attempted to capture Cockstock but could not find him.

Cockstock had an earlier complaint against Elijah White after a relative had been punished for breaking into the home of Rev. HKW Perkins and threatening him with flogging. Cockstock was also implicated in an earlier quarrel and openly advocated against the application of Elijah White's laws to Native American tribes on matters of criminal justice and land ownership.

On March 4, 1844, Cockstock returned to Willamette Falls with an interpreter and four Wascos to ask settlers why they were "pursuing him with hostile intentions." A crowd led by George LeBreton, recorder of the Oregon legislature, rushed Cockstock in an attempt to arrest him, with some pioneers wanting to "shoot him at any risk."

Cockstock resisted arrest, and he and two white settlers, LeBreton and Sterling Rogers, were killed. Cockstock is said to have died of a broken skull from the barrel of Winslow Anderson's rifle.

Response 
The Wasco tribe was angry, and argued that Cockstock had not gone to the town with violent intent. Elijah White personally maintained peace between settlers and the Wascos, offering payment of "two blankets, a dress, and [a] handkerchief" to Cockstock's widow.

Saules, who was married to a Native American woman, was later arrested for threatening to incite "his wife's people" against white settlers. Another account alleges that Saules threatened to "incense the Indians" against Charles E. Pickette during an argument with him. Saules was forced to relocate to Clatsop County.

As the first violent confrontation between Native Americans and pioneers in Oregon, the incident was part of the motivation for a bill by Oregon's Provisional Government to exclude all blacks from Oregon. Many white settlers feared that black settlers would escalate tensions with Natives, and the Oregon Rangers was organised on 23 March 1844 in response.

Elijah White cited the Cockstock Incident and mentioned Saules in a May 1, 1844 letter to United States Secretary of War James Madison Porter, writing that Saules "remains in that vicinity with his Indian wife and family, conducting [behaving], as yet, in a quiet manner, but doubtless ought to be transported, together with every other negro, being in our condition dangerous subjects. Until we have some further means of protection their immigration ought to be prohibited. Can this be done?"

1844 exclusion law
On July 25, 1844, Peter Burnett introduced, and the legislature approved, the Black Exclusion bill, which prohibited African Americans from entering the territory and required all slave owning settlers in Oregon to release black slaves within three years of arrival, or the slaves would be immediately freed. Furthermore, it called for all previous slaves to leave Oregon within two years for men and three years for women, or they would be whipped "not less than 20 nor more than 39 times" every six months. That section was amended in December 1844 to remove whipping before any such punishment had occurred, but it forced freed slaves back into public auction. Historian Thomas McClintock has written that the connection between the Cockstock incident and the Exclusion Law is "unquestionable".

References 

1844 in Oregon Country
Pre-statehood history of Oregon
Racially motivated violence in the United States
Native American history of Oregon
White supremacy in the United States
African-American history of Oregon